Elections to Wigan Council were held on 10 June 2004. The whole council was up for election with boundary changes since the last election in 2003 increasing the number of councillors by three. The Labour Party kept overall control of the council.

Election result

This result had the following consequences for the total number of seats on the Council after the elections:

Ward results

By-elections between 2004 and 2006

References

Local government in the Metropolitan Borough of Wigan
2004 English local elections
2004
2000s in Greater Manchester